Kem may refer to:

People 
Kem (singer) (born 1969), R&B musician
Kem Cetinay (born 1996), English television personality

Places 
Kem (river), a river in the Republic of Karelia, Russia
Kem (Yenisey), a river in Siberia, Russia
Kem, Russia, a town in the Republic of Karelia, Russia
Kem, an alternative name for Cham-e Mahavi, a village in Khuzestan Province, Iran
Kem', a crater on Mars
King Edward Mine, a tin mine in Cornwall, United Kingdom
Kemi-Tornio Airport (IATA: KEM), Finland

Other 
Kem, brand of playing cards by United States Playing Card Company
Key encapsulation mechanism, an encryption technique for securing a symmetric key with asymmetric keys

See also
Cem
Kemi, a town and a municipality in Finland
Kemp (disambiguation)